Purpuradusta minoridens, common name : the small-toothed cowry,  is a species of tropical sea snail, a cowry, a marine gastropod mollusk in the family Cypraeidae.

Subspecies
 Purpuradusta minoridens julianjosephi Lorenz, 2017
 Purpuradusta minoridens minoridens (Melvill, 1901)

Description
The shell of this species is white in color with orange-yellow dots, and it has a reddish-purple tip.

Distribution
The species is found in the Philippines, South West Pacific; Japan, Samoa and  South East Africa

References

 Steyn, D.G. & Lussi, M. (1998) Marine Shells of South Africa. An Illustrated Collector’s Guide to Beached Shells. Ekogilde Publishers, Hartebeespoort, South Africa, ii + 264 pp. page(s): 66

External links
 Gastropods.com : Purpuradusta minoridens + photos
 On-line articles with Cypraea minoridens in the HAWAIIAN SHELL NEWS (1960-1994)
 Melvill, J. C. (1901). Cypraea chrysalis Kien. and C. microdon Gray. Journal of Conchology. 10 (4): 117-119

Cypraeidae
Gastropods described in 1901